Lamellitrochus fenestratus is a species of sea snail, a marine gastropod mollusk in the family Solariellidae.

Description
The size of the shell attains 3.4 mm.

Distribution
This marine species occurs in the Lesser Antilles off Barbados at depths between 183 m and 229 m.

References

 Quinn, J. F., Jr. 1991. Lamellitrochus, a new genus of Solariellinae (Gastropoda: Trochidae), with descriptions of six new species from the Western Atlantic Ocean. Nautilus 105: 81-91

External links
 To Biodiversity Heritage Library (1 publication)
 To Encyclopedia of Life
 To USNM Invertebrate Zoology Mollusca Collection
 To World Register of Marine Species

fenestratus
Gastropods described in 1991